Lilias, Yoga and You (later shortened to Lilias!) is a PBS television show hosted by Lilias Folan, a Cincinnati, Ohio based practitioner of yoga as exercise. The show first aired on October 5, 1970 on Cincinnati PBS member station WCET and three years later was carried on PBS across the United States, where it ran until 1999.

Yoga presenter

Lilias Folan (born 1936) began to practice yoga as exercise in 1964, and was soon teaching at the YWCA in Stamford, Connecticut. She studied asanas under the yoga masters T. K. V. Desikachar, B. K. S. Iyengar, and Angela Farmer, and gained wider knowledge of yoga under the Sivananda Yoga masters Swami Vishnudevananda and Swami Satchidananda. She joined the Connecticut ashram of the Divine Life Society led by Swami Chidananda. In the 1980s she met Swami Muktananda, creator of Siddha Yoga, who told her to teach meditation. Through her show she became known to Americans as the "First Lady of Yoga". She is married with two sons and seven grandchildren.

Lilias! Yoga Gets Better With Age
WCET premiered  Lilias! Yoga Gets Better With Age in March 2006, highlighting Folan's career and exploring the impact yoga has on the mind, body and spirit.

Books and other media

Folan has published four books: Lilias, Yoga and You (1972), Lilias, Yoga and Your Life (1981), Lilias! Yoga Gets Better With Age (2005), and Lilias! Yoga: Your Guide to Enhancing Body, Mind, and Spirit in Midlife and Beyond (November 1, 2011)

Several VHS and DVD recordings of her yoga routines have been released, plus an audio-only book, Lilias Yoga Complete (1987), and one meditation CD, The Inner Smile (1998).

Music
The music playing during the show's opening credits was "The Valley of the Bells" from Maurice Ravel's Miroirs.

Commentary
San Francisco Chronicle columnist Gerald Nachman observed of the television program in 1979, "My yoga lady remains a mystery woman, a comely creature from a distant planet ... Lilias is demure and quite serious ... By far her most intriguing aspect is that she never sweats ... She seems friendly, but if you tried flirting, I suspect she'd politely guide the conversation back to firming up those inner thighs."

See also
Folan (surname)

References

Sources

External links

LILIAS FOLAN: First Lady of Yoga  Cincinnati Fifty Plus!  August 2003 By Kirstin Taylor

Yoga mass media
Exercise television shows
PBS original programming
1972 American television series debuts
1999 American television series endings
Mass media in Cincinnati
1980s American television series